Camptostoma is a genus of birds in the tyrant flycatcher family Tyrannidae.

Extant species
The genus contains two species.

These are very small passerine birds which breed in the tropical and subtropical Americas from the southernmost USA south to Paraguay, Bolivia, and Argentina. The two species are similar, and were once considered conspecific. However, they overlap without interbreeding in central Costa Rica.

These are species of light forests, cultivation and gardens with trees. The domed nest is made of plant fibre or leaves with a side entrance.

They are active birds, feeding in a vireo or warbler-like fashion on insects, spiders and berries.

References 

 Stiles and Skutch,  A guide to the birds of Costa Rica 

 
Bird genera
Taxa named by Philip Sclater